Ian Michael Raspin (born 31 March 1967 in Guisborough) is a British slalom canoeist who competed from the late 1980s to the early 2000s. He won two medals in the K1 team event at the ICF Canoe Slalom World Championships with a gold in 1997 and a bronze in 1995.

Raspin also competed in two Summer Olympics, earning his best finish of ninth in the K1 event in Atlanta in 1996.

Ian has a younger brother, Andrew "Kidda" Raspin, also a British slalom canoeist who competed from the late 1980s to the early 2000s.

World Cup individual podiums

References

1967 births
English male canoeists
Canoeists at the 1992 Summer Olympics
Canoeists at the 1996 Summer Olympics
Living people
Olympic canoeists of Great Britain
People from Guisborough
Sportspeople from Yorkshire
British male canoeists
Medalists at the ICF Canoe Slalom World Championships